Brad Mayo (born June 5, 1980) is an American Republican politician. He was a member of the Mississippi House of Representatives from the 12th District from 2011 through 2014.

References

1980 births
Living people
Politicians from Kansas City, Missouri
Republican Party members of the Mississippi House of Representatives